Victory Memorial Hospital was a 254-bed medical facility. It was announced in 2006 that they're closing; they were acquired by SUNY Downstate Medical Center in 2009 and renamed SUNY Downstate at Bay Ridge.

History
Victory Memorial was a not-for-profit, voluntary hospital. Most of the hospital's "complex of dun-colored buildings at the southeastern edge of Bay Ridge" were built in 1927, but they opened earlier in a single building at their 92nd Street/Seventh Avenue Brooklyn location.

Decades ago, the families whose children were born therein were largely Irish and Italian; before closing, they were "more likely to be Chinese or Russian" or "speak Urdu, Tagalog, Arabic and Spanish."

In the 1960s, Victory Memorial built a new wing and added 64 beds, with recognition given for "increasing hospital facilities in Brooklyn."

On June 25, 2021 Maimonides Medical Center broke ground for a new 15,000 square foot, free standing Emergency Department at Victory. The event was seen WABC-7, WPIX-11 and News12.

Incidents
 Two patients were murdered in the hospital by the son of one of them in 1999.
 The driver and a bystander died when "a tank truck delivering liquid oxygen exploded outside" the hospital. A year-long investigation by the National Transportation Safety Board discovered "a complex, explosive chemi cal reaction, lasting a second or less" described as a "series of events never before observed."
 H.I.V.-Tainted blood given "during emergency ulcer surgery."
 "The hospital's director of radiology" and "the hospital's assistant director of radiology" pleaded guilty to "failure to file a [tax] return for three years." They ran a side business that "supplies radiology technicians to various health-care providers" (including Victory Memorial).

See also
 List of hospitals in Brooklyn

References

  

Defunct hospitals in Brooklyn
Hospitals established in 1927
Maternity hospitals in the United States
SUNY Downstate Medical Center
History of women in New York City